The Georgia Perimeter College Botanical Garden (4 acres) is a botanical garden located on the Decatur Campus of the Georgia Perimeter College at 3251 Panthersville Road, Decatur, Georgia, United States. The garden is open daily without fee.

The garden was established in 1990 by George Sanko as the DeKalb College Botanical Garden. It now contains over 4,000 species of native, rare, and endangered plants indigenous to the American Southeast. The garden includes bog plants, native trees, shrubs, vines, and perennial plants, as well as an impressive fern collection and about ¾ mile of walking trails.

See also 
 List of botanical gardens in the United States

External links 
https://sites.gsu.edu/pcnativegarden/

Botanical gardens in Georgia (U.S. state)
Protected areas of DeKalb County, Georgia